Nida Patcharaveerapong (13 September 1984 — 24 February 2022), formerly and still colloquially known as Pattaratida Patcharaveerapong, better known by nickname Tangmo, was a famous Thai actress known for her main roles in several Thai dramas. She made her acting debut in 2003.

Biography

Early life
She was born in Bangkok as Tangmo Patcharaveerapong. Her parents split up when she was just five years old, so she has always lived with her father. Nida has only one sibling, Toi-Dayos, a half-brother.

She made her debut in the showbiz when she was a Matthayom 1 grader (7th grade) by filming commercials. Many years later, in 2002, she entered the Miss Teen Thailand Pageant and got the 4th runner-up place, so Nida entered the showbiz fully.

Nida was Protestant following Phuket-born, Trang father, Sophon Patcharaveerapong. While her mother, Panida Siriyudthayothin, is a former actress from Lopburi who worked in the '70s

Married life
At the end of 2013, she got engaged to a fellow entertainer Phakin Khamwilaisak. The couple engaged for 2 years and 1 month before breaking up in 2015.

Death
On February 24, 2022 about 10:32 pm, Tangmo Nida fell from a speedboat into Chao Phraya River. Her body was recovered two days later on February 26, 2022. On April 26, 2022 the Royal Thai Police overruled that no foul play was involved in her death, but pressed charges against six people for "recklessness" and involvement in her death.

Acting career

Television series
{{columns-list|colwidth=20em|
 Say Yom See (2016)
Wan Ne Te lor koy (2013)
Se Sa hay Sa buy Dee (2012)Sao Noy Roy Lem Kwien (2012)Pleng Ruk Baan Nah (2011)Jao Ying Lhong Yook (2011)Lui (2011)
Ruk Tae Kae Dai (2009)
Dum Kum (2009)
Koo Pbuan Olawon (2008)
Talard Nam Damnern Ruk 2 (2008)
Pieng Peun Fah (2007)
Kasanaka (2007)
Plaew Fai Nai Fhun (2006)Muen Rao Ja Rak Kun Mai Dai (2006)Yai Bai Bahm (2006)
Roong Keang Dao (2005)Payak Rai Hua Jai Jiew (2005)Oun Ai Ruk (2004)Benja Keta Kwarm Rak (2003)Prissana (2000)
}}

TV dramas
 2000 Prissana (2000) (ปริศนา) (Two In One/Ch.7) as Mon Jao Ying Rattanawadee's Friend (เพื่อนหม่อมเจ้าหญิงรัตนาวดี)
 2001 Petch Tud Petch (2001) (เพชรตัดเพชร) (Dara Video/Ch.7) as Pin (ปิ่น)
 2003 Benja Keta Kwarm Ruk (เบญจา คีตา ความรัก) (Dara Video/Ch.7) as Fiat (เฟียซ)
 2004 Oun I Ruk (อุ่นไอรัก) (Dara Video/Ch.7) as Khantima harasuk (Kawao) (กานติมา ธาราสุข (กาเหว่า)) with Siwat Chotchaicharin
 2005 Pa Yak Rai Hau Jai Jew (พยัคฆ์ร้ายหัวใจจิ๋ว) (Pau Jin Jong/Ch.7) as Saprangfah (สะพรั่งฟ้า) with Danuporn Punnakun
 2005 Roong Keang Dao (รุ้งเคียงดาว) (Hunkmnoga/Ch.7) as Roong (Rainbow) / Dao (Star) (แสงดาว / พราวรุ้ง (รับบทฝาแฝด)) with Kade Tarntup
 2006 Yai Bai Bah (ยัยไบบ้า) (Red Drama/Ch.7) as Sabai (สไบ) with Thana Suttikamul
 2006 Muen Rao Ja Rak Kun Mai Dai (เหมือนเราจะรักกันไม่ได้) (มาสเคอร์ เรด/Ch.7) as Piangor (เพียงออ) with Vee Veraparb Suparbpaiboon
 2006 Plaew Fai Nai Fhun (2006) (เปลวไฟในฝัน) (Dara Video/Ch.7) as Mali (มะลิ) with Kade Tarntup
 2007 Kasanka (กาษา นาคา) (Pau Jin Jong/Ch.7) as Winta (Winny) (วินตา (วินนี่))
 2007 Pieng Peun Fah (เพียงผืนฟ้า) (Dara Video/Ch.7) as (พลอย) with Tle Tawan Jarujinda
 2008 Talard Nam Damnern Ruk Part 2 (2008) (ตลาดน้ำดำเนินฯ รัก 2) (559 On Air/Ch.7) as with Tle Tawan Jarujinda
 2008 Koo Pbuan Olawon (คู่ป่วนอลวน) (Dida Video Production/Ch.7) as Pawika (ภาวิกา) with Vee Veraparb Suparbpaiboon
 2009 Dum Kum (ดำขำ) (Exact-Scenario/Ch.7) as Noodum (กาฬมณี (หนูดำ)) with Pong Nawat Kulrattanarak
 2011 Lui (ลุย) (Dida Video Production/Ch.7) as Soysiri (สร้อยคีรี) with Vee Veraparb Suparbpaiboon
 2011 Jao Ying Lhong Yook (เจ้าหญิงหลงยุค) (Mirabilis/Ch.7) as Jao Ying Kannikakesorn (Kannika) (เจ้าหญิงกรรณิกาเกสร (กรรณิการ์)) with Khun Kanin
 2011 Pleng Ruk Baan Nah (เพลงรักบ้านนา) (Dida Video Production/Ch.7) as SeePlae (ศรีแพร) with Tle Thanapon Nimtaisuk
 2012 Sao Noy Roy Lem Kwien (สาวน้อยร้อยเล่มเกวียน) (Media Studio/Ch.7) as (วีนัส พิพัฒวัฒนากุล (วี)) with Oun Rangsit
 2013 Wan Nee Tee Ror Khoi 2013 (วันนี้ที่รอคอย) (Por Dee Kam/Ch.7) as Jao Meu Ing (จ้าวเหม่ยอิง)
 2013 Nak Soo Maha Gaan (นักสู้มหากาฬ) (Mum Mai/Ch.7) as Natcha (ร.ต.อ.หญิง ณัฐชา) with Sukollawat Kanaros
 2015 Phloeng Dao (เพลิงดาว) (MONEYPLUS ENTERTAINMENT/PPTVHD36) as Montika Bunprasoet (มณฑิกา บุญประเสริฐ) with Bom Tana Eamniyom
 2015 Khunying Nok Thamniap (คุณหญิงนอกทำเนียบ) (RS/Ch.8) as Khunying Supatsagee (คุณหญิสุพัตศจี) with Fluke Jira Danbawornkiat
 2016 Sane Rai Ubai Rak (เสน่ห์ร้ายอุบายรัก) (MONEYPLUS ENTERTAINMENT/PPTVHD36) as Porpiang Porjareinkun (Par) (พอเพียง พอเจริญกุล (แพร)) with Bie Thassapak Hsu
 2017 Sai Yom Si (ทรายย้อมสี) (RS/Ch.8) as Maneeyong Sangpaiboon (Yong) (มณียง แสงไพบูรณ์ (ยง)) with Fluke Krekpon Mussayawanich, Mark Apiwit Jakthreemongkol, Krit Amornchailerk, Sun Prachakorn Piyasakulkaew, Ball Vittavat Singlumpong
 2018 Sai Ruk Sai Sawaat 2018 (สายรักสายสวาท) (The One Enterprise/One 31) as Fongkae (ฟองแข​ อินต๊ะ​ / ฟองแข วรากร ณ อยุธยา / ฟองแข ณ เวียงสรวง) with Fluke Krekpon Mussayawanich & Captain Phutanate Hongmanop
 2019 Bai Mai Tee Plid Plew (ใบไม้ที่ปลิดปลิว) (The One Enterprise-CHANGE2561/One 31) as Rungrong (Nira's aunt) (รังรอง สิริวัฒน์ (รอง)) with Puttichai Kasetsin
 2019 Leh Runjuan (เล่ห์รัญจวน) (Aplus Production/Ch.8) as Bulan (บุหลัน) with Nike Nitidon Pomsuwan 
 2020 Nuer Nai (เนื้อใน) (CHANGE2561/GMM 25) as Kanya (Kan) (กัญญา (กัญ))

TV Series
 2004  (รวมพลคนก้นบาตร) (Pau Jin Jong/Ch.7) as Tang Kwa (แตงกวา) with เจษฎา รุ่งสาคร
 2006  (ยายหนูลูกพ่อ) (Dara Video-DIDA Video-Samsearn/Ch.7) as Ampila (อัมพิลา) with Atsadawut Luengsuntorn
 2013 Saai Yai (สายใย) (/Ch.7) as Namo with Arnus Rapanich
 2016 Club Friday The Series 7: Ruk Tong Leuk (Club Friday the series 7 เหตุ..เกิดจากความรัก ตอน รักต้องเลือก) (A-TIME MEDIA/GMM 25) as Aem with Boy Pidsanu Nimsakul
 2016 The Extra (วงการร้าย วงการรัก) (GREATEST ENTERTAINMENT/Channel 9) as Pat (ภัทร)
 2017  (Guiding Light ก้าวตามรอยพ่อ ตอน นางฟ้าเดินดิน) (GREATEST ENTERTAINMENT/Channel 9) as Dr.Jieb (หมอเจี๊ยบ)
 2017 Under Her Nose (พ่อบ้านใจกล้าสตอรี่) (The Pipal Tree/Workpoint TV) as Cris (คริส) (EP.03)
 2018 Mueng Maya Live The Series Part 4: Maya Ruk On Lie (เมืองมายา Live ตอน มายารัก On Lie) (The One Enterprise/One 31) as Dao Dara (ดารา บูรณะสวัสดิ์ (ดาว)) with Shahkrit Yamnam
 2018 It's Complicated 2018 (เพราะรักมันซับซ้อน) (Bearcave Studio/LINE TV) as Jue (จือ) with Aon Sarawut Martthong
 2018 Club Friday the Series 10 (Club Friday the Series 10 รักนอกใจ ตอน รักที่ไม่อยากเลือก) (CHANGE2561/GMM 25) as Tong (ตอง)
 2018 Bangkok Love Stories 2 Mai Diang Sa (Bangkok รัก Stories 2 ตอน ไม่เดียงสา) (GMM Bravo/GMM 25) as Clo-Dia (คลอเดีย)

The drama that used to be set
 2022 Krasue Lam Sing (กระสือลำซิ่ง) (Cheer Up/Ch.8) as (not accepting (ไม่รับเล่น))
 2022 Sisa Marn (2022) (ศีรษะมาร) (RS/Ch.8) as Pilantha Wichianpatt (Pee') / Preeya (ปิลันธา วิเชียรภัทธ (ปี๋) / ปรียา) (not accepting (ไม่รับเล่น))
 2022 To Sir, With Love (2022) - Khun Chai (2022) (คุณชาย) (The One Enterprise/One 31) as (คุณจันทร์ (อาจันทร์) / ซ้อรอง) (sudden death The production team has given Panward Hemanee to play this role instead. (เสียชีวิตอย่างกะทันหัน ทางทีมงานสร้างจึงได้ให้ปานวาดรับบทนี้แทน))

TV Sitcom
 2008 Happy Library (ห้องสมุดสุดหรรษา) (/Ch.7) as Fun (ฝุ่น) with Au Panu Suwanno 
 2009 Ruk Tae Kae Dai (รักแท้แก้ได้) (/Ch.7) as Ok Choie (อบเชย) with Tle Thanapon Nimtaisuk
 2010 Peaw Tarad Taek (เปรี้ยวตลาดแตก) (TV Thunder/Ch.7) as (เปรี้ยว) with Kade Tarntup
 2010  (หมู่ 7 เด็ดสะระตี่) (TV Thunder/Ch.7) as Mok (หมอก)
 2012  (สี่สหายสบายดี) (559 On Air/Ch.7) as Ploysouy (พลอยสวย) with Anuwat Choocherdratana

 Movies 
 2003 Ghost of Mae Nak (นาค รักแท้ วิญญาณ ความตาย) (Box Office Entertainment) as Nak (นาค) with Siwat Chotchaicharin
 2010  (ปรุงหัวใจใส่คนอร์รสทิพ) as 
 2016  (ป๊าด 888 แรงทะลุนรก) as 
 2018  (เลิฟเดอะเทอทีน) as 
 2018  The Last Heroes (ตุ๊ดตุ่กู้ชาติ) (M Pictures) as 2nd consort of Burmese King
 2021  (หอแต๋วแตกแหกโควิด ปังปุริเย่) as 

 Ost. 
 Dramas : Benja Keta Kwarm Ruk (เบญจา คีตา ความรัก)
 Songs : (ดนตรีในหัวใจ - นักแสดงร้องทั้งหมด)
 Songs : (ไม่ว่าง - ร้องร่วมกับ หนูอิมอิม ก้าวมหัศาจรรย์, ทรายขวัญ หาญหนองบัว)

 Dramas : Pa Yak Rai Hau Jai Jew (พยัคร้ายหัวใจจิ๋ว)
 Songs : (คนที่รออยู่)

 Dramas : Kasanaka (กาษานาคา)
 Songs : (ไถ่รักแท้ด้วยศรัทธา)

 Dramas : Jao Ying Lhong Yook (เจ้าหญิงหลงยุค)
 Songs : (รักเธอไปทุกยุค)

 Dramas : Nak Soo Maha Gaan (นักสู้มหากาฬ)
 Songs : Jark Kon Koey Glai (จากคนเคยใกล้)

 Dramas : Sao Noy Roy Lem Kwien (สาวน้อยร้อยเล่มเกวียน)
 Songs : Jark Nee Pai Jon Ni Run (จากนี้ไปจนนิรันดร์) On Air YouTube:GMM GRAMMY OFFICIAL

 Dramas : Sane Rai Ubai Rak (เสน่ห์ร้ายอุบายรัก)
 Songs : (สองความรู้สึกในหัวใจเดียวกัน)

 Dramas : Sai Yom Si (ทรายย้อมสี)
 Songs : Plueak (เปลือก) On Air YouTube:rsfriends

 Music Video 
 2003 Prou Ter Pen Kon Dee (เพราะเธอเป็นคนดี) - Baby Bull (RS/YouTube:rsfriends) with ธัชพล ชุมดวง (ตูน AF 3)
 2009  (รู้หว่าว) - กันย์ (อำพล เตาลานนท์) (RS/YouTube:พระนครฟิลม์ Phranakornfilm) 
 2010  (เหมือนตาย...ทั้งที่ใกล้กัน) - Thanapond Wagprayoon (RS/YouTube:rsfriends) with Somchai Kemglad
 2011 Chiwit Khu (ชีวิตคู่) - Thanapond Wagprayoon (RS/YouTube:rsfriends) with Somchai Kemglad
 2011  (ตัวถ่วง) - Nexus (/YouTube:imusicThailand) with Nutt Dechapanya
 2012 รั้ง (Runk) - Phunkorn Boonyachinda (Revol Music Creation/YouTube:Revol Music Creation) with Nawat Kulrattanarak
 2016  (กลับตัวกลับใจ) - Dax Rock Rider (Me Records/YouTube:ME RECORDS)
 2017  (ฉันมันแค่แฟนเก่า (Ex Soul))'' - Tah Mint Dodge Go - TMDG (ต๊ะ  มิ้นท์ ด็อจ โก้ - TMDG) (B-Mix) (DemoLab/YouTube:DEMOLAB)

MC
 2016 : คอหนังข้างถนน On Air GMM 25 (ก็อตซิป กัน (GossipGun), Pongsatorn Jongwilas, Rusameekae Fagerlund, Thanakorn Phowijit) (2016–2018)

References

 

1984 births
2022 deaths
Nida Patcharaveerapong
Nida Patcharaveerapong
Nida Patcharaveerapong
Nida Patcharaveerapong
Nida Patcharaveerapong
Nida Patcharaveerapong
Nida Patcharaveerapong
Thai television personalities
Nida Patcharaveerapong
Nida Patcharaveerapong
Nida Patcharaveerapong
Nida Patcharaveerapong
Actresses of Chinese descent 
Nida Patcharaveerapong
2020–2021 Thai protests
Deaths by drowning
Deaths from asphyxiation